Abbasabad-e Esfak (also Romanized as ‘Abbāsābād-e Esfak; also known as ‘Abbāsābād) is a village in Kuh Panj Rural District, in the Central District of Bardsir County, Kerman Province, Iran. At the 2006 census, its population was 43, in 11 families.

References 

Populated places in Bardsir County